Mariya Korobitskaya (born 10 May 1990) is a Kyrgyzstani long distance runner who specialises in the marathon. She competed in the women's marathon event at the 2016 Summer Olympics held in Rio de Janeiro, Brazil. In 2019, she competed in the women's marathon at the 2019 World Athletics Championships held in Doha, Qatar. She did not finish her race.

References

External links
 

1990 births
Living people
Kyrgyzstani female long-distance runners
Kyrgyzstani female marathon runners
Athletes (track and field) at the 2016 Summer Olympics
Olympic athletes of Kyrgyzstan
Sportspeople from Bishkek